Rick Lamb (born September 20, 1990) is an American professional golfer.

Lamb was born and raised in South Bend, Indiana. He played college golf at the University of Tennessee after transferring from Santa Clara University. At Tennessee, he won three events. In his final collegiate event, Lamb finished T-2 at the 2013 NCAA Division I Championship. 

Lamb earned limited status on the 2016 Web.com Tour after a tie for 79th at qualifying school in December 2015, but had to rely on sponsor exemptions and Monday qualifying to get into tournaments. In July 2016, he won the LECOM Health Challenge, becoming the first Monday qualifier to win on the Web.com Tour since Sebastian Cappelen at the 2014 Air Capital Classic.

Personal life
Lamb grew up playing both golf and hockey at a high level, later choosing to attend IMG Academies in Bradenton, Florida to pursue golf. Lamb's identical twin brother Scott currently plays on PGA Tour Latinoamérica.

Amateur wins
2012 Yale Spring Opener, Gifford Collegiate-CordeValle
2013 SeaBest Invitational

Sources:

Professional wins (1)

Web.com Tour wins (1)

Web.com Tour playoff record (1–0)

Results in major championships

"T" = tied

See also
2016 Web.com Tour Finals graduates

References

External links

American male golfers
Santa Clara Broncos men's golfers
Tennessee Volunteers men's golfers
PGA Tour golfers
Korn Ferry Tour graduates
Golfers from Indiana
Left-handed golfers
Sportspeople from South Bend, Indiana
1990 births
Living people